Neuilly–Porte Maillot is a station in Paris's express suburban rail system, the RER. It is situated in the 17th arrondissement of Paris. It is on line C. By 2024, it should be connected also to line E of the RER.

Adjacent station 
 Porte Maillot on Paris Métro Line 1.

Tourism 
 Bois de Boulogne
 Palais des congrès de Paris

See also 
 List of stations of the Paris RER
 List of stations of the Paris Métro

External links 
 

Réseau Express Régional stations
Railway stations in Paris
Railway stations in France opened in 1854
Buildings and structures in the 16th arrondissement of Paris
Buildings and structures in the 17th arrondissement of Paris